Abubakarpur is a union territory of Char Fasson Upazila in Bhola district in Bangladesh.

Area
The area of Abubakarpur Union is 10,108 acres.

Administrative structure
Abubakarpur Union is a union of Char Fasson Upazila. Administrative activities of this union are under Dular Hat police Station. It is part of Bhola-4 constituency 118 of the National Assembly.

Population data
According to the 2011 census, the total population of Abubakarpur Union is 12,302. Of these, 6,032 are males and 6270 are females. The total number of families is 2,848.

Education
According to the 2011 census, Abubakarpur Union has an average literacy rate of 56.7%.

See also

Abdullahpur Union

References

Unions of Char Fasson Upazila
Unions of Bhola District
Char Fasson Upazila